Golden Attraction (foaled 1993 in Kentucky) is an American Thoroughbred racemare who in 1995 won five important stakes races, including three Grade I events, and was voted American Champion Two-Year-Old Filly. She was bred and raced by William Young's Overbrook Farm and trained by U.S. Racing Hall of Fame inductee, D. Wayne Lukas.

References

1993 racehorse births
Thoroughbred family 14-c
Racehorses bred in Kentucky
Racehorses trained in the United States
Eclipse Award winners